Ruth Weijden (born Ruth Augusta Gustafsson; 20 July 1889 – 27 June 1956) was a Swedish stage and film actress.

Selected filmography
 The Saga of Gosta Berling (1924)
 Sin (1928)
 Artificial Svensson (1929)
 Ulla, My Ulla (1930)
 His Life's Match (1932)
 What Do Men Know? (1933)
 Fridolf in the Lion's Den (1933)
 Saturday Nights (1933)
 Eva Goes Aboard (1934)
 Andersson's Kalle (1934)
 The Marriage Game (1935)
 The People of Småland (1935)
 The Family Secret (1936)
 Youth of Today (1936)
 Good Friends and Faithful Neighbours (1938)
 Storm Over the Skerries (1938)
Lucky Young Lady (1941)
 A Girl for Me (1943)
 Count Only the Happy Moments (1944)
 Black Roses (1945)
 The Serious Game (1945)
 How to Love (1947)
 I Love You Karlsson (1947)
 The Devil and the Smalander (1949)

References

Bibliography 
 A. Kwiatkowski. Swedish Film Classics. Courier Corporation, 2013.

External links 
 

Actresses from Stockholm
1889 births
1956 deaths
Swedish film actresses
Swedish silent film actresses
20th-century Swedish actresses
Swedish stage actresses